The 2017 Croatian Cup is the 26th edition of the tournament.

Schedule
The rounds of the 2017 competition are scheduled as follows:

Preliminary round
The first round ties are scheduled for 1 and 3 December 2017.

Group A
Tournament will be played at Bazen u Gružu, Dubrovnik.

Group B
Tournament will be played at Bazen Crnica, Šibenik.

Final four

The final four will be held on 16 and 17 December 2017 at the Sports Park Mladost in Zagreb.

Semi-finals

Final

Final standings

References

External links
 Croatian Water Polo Federaration

Croatian Water Polo Cup
Croatian Water Polo Cup Men